The 25th Serbia Division (Serbo-Croatian Latin: Dvadesetpeta srpska divizija) was a Yugoslav Partisan division formed on 10 June 1944 in Jošanica. It was formed from the 16th, 18th and 19th Serbia Brigades. Upon formation it had around 3,000 soldiers, it grew to around 12,000 by December 1944. The division was direct command of the Supreme Headquarters until 6 September 1944. It became a part of the 2nd Army in January 1945.

References 

Divisions of the Yugoslav Partisans
Military units and formations established in 1944